Alinobia is a genus of moths from the family Noctuidae.

References
Natural History Museum Lepidoptera genus database

Hadeninae
Noctuoidea genera